Skrzeszew  is a village in the administrative district of Gmina Repki, within Sokołów County, Masovian Voivodeship, in east-central Poland. The village has a population of 460.

In 1428 the village was given by Vytautas the Great to bishopric of Luck. The parish of Skrzeszew was established in 1446. In 1808 the village was bought by Franciszek Obniski, who equipped the interior of the church. The Baroque-Neoclassical church from 1st half of 18th century, was damaged in 1915 and restored in 1918. The manor of Skrzeszew was destroyed by Soviet occupation forces in 1939.

References

Villages in Sokołów County